No Time for Shame is a 2019 reality television show web television series. The premise revolves around Argentinian fashion designer Santiago Artemis.

Cast 
 Edwin Salinas
 Santiago Artemis

Release 
No Time for Shame was released on November 19, 2019, on Netflix.

References

External links
 
 

2019 Argentine television series debuts
2010s Argentine television series
Spanish-language Netflix original programming